The Kerry Packer Foundation was announced by James Packer at the MCG on 26 December 2006, with an A$10 million endowment for the support of disadvantaged cricketers in Australia. The announcement came on the first anniversary of the death of billionaire tycoon and cricket lover Kerry Packer.

References

Foundations based in Australia
Cricket in Australia